Oscar Dautt (born 8 June 1976) is a Mexican former professional footballer who played as a goalkeeper.

Career

Club
Once considered among Mexico's most promising young goalkeepers, Dautt played regularly in the Liga MX between 1998 and 2008, enjoying successful stints with Monterrey, Toros Neza, Puebla, Tigres UANL and Tijuana FC, before losing his place with Puebla during the 2009 Clausura campaign. He played the 2009 Apertura campaign with Lobos BUAP in Mexico's second-tier Liga de Ascenso, before being released at the end of the season.

In December 2010 Dautt signed with the expansion Los Angeles Blues of the new USL Professional League.

International
Dautt was named to the Mexico national team for the 2001 FIFA Confederations Cup, but he has never been featured in any of the games.

References

External links
 

1976 births
Living people
Footballers from Sinaloa
Association football goalkeepers
Mexican footballers
2001 FIFA Confederations Cup players
C.F. Monterrey players
Toros Neza footballers
Club Puebla players
Tigres UANL footballers
Lobos BUAP footballers
Club Tijuana footballers
Orange County SC players
Liga MX players
USL Championship players
Mexican expatriate footballers
Expatriate soccer players in the United States
Mexican expatriate sportspeople in the United States
Club Tijuana non-playing staff